Pay may refer to:

A wage or salary earned for work
The process of payment

Places
Pay-e Borj, a village in Lorestan Province of Iran
Pay-e Kal-e Garab, a village in Ilam Province of Iran
Pay-e Rah, a village in Khuzestan Province of Iran
Pay Lake, a lake in Minnesota, USA

Other
Pay (geology), the portion of a reservoir that contains economically recoverable hydrocarbons
Partido Alianza por Yucatán, a political party in Mexico
The Hebrew letter Pe
Verifone (NYSE stock ticker: PAY)

People with the surname Pay
 Antony Pay (born 1945), English clarinettist
 Dean Pay (born 1969), Australian rugby league footballer
 E. J. Pay (died 1931), British labour movement activist
 Jill Pay (born 1951), Serjeant at Arms, House of Commons, UK
 Kevin Pay (1939–2020), Australian rules footballer

See also 
 Pay as you go (disambiguation)
 Pay Day (disambiguation)
 Pay It (disambiguation)
 Pay it forward (disambiguation)
 Pay Less (disambiguation)
 Payback (disambiguation)
 Paye (disambiguation)
 Pey (disambiguation)